Montancy (unofficial also Montancy-Brémoncourt) is a commune in the Doubs department in the Bourgogne-Franche-Comté region in eastern France.

Geography
The village of Brémoncourt lies in the valley of the Doubs at 430 m, and Montancy on the plateau at 900 m.

Population

See also
 Communes of the Doubs department

References

External links
 Montancy-Brémoncourt on the intercommunal Web site of the department

External links

 Official Web site 

Communes of Doubs